Mackenzie's Raiders is an American Western television series starring Richard Carlson that aired thirty-nine episodes in syndication between 1958 and 1959. The series is narrated by Art Gilmore, and was produced by Ziv Television Programs.

Synopsis

Cast
 Richard Carlson as Colonel Ranald S. Mackenzie (39 episodes)
 Kenneth Alton as Raider (11 episodes)
 Morris Ankrum as Raider (12 episodes)
 Charles Boaz as Corporal Dixon (11 episodes)
 Jim Bridges as Private Lewis (11 episodes)
 Louis Jean Heydt as Raider (11 episodes)
 Brett King as Raider (11 episodes)

Guest stars
 John Archer
 Jim Bannon
 Jeanne Bates
 Rand Brooks (multiple appearances)
 Harry Carey, Jr.
 Iron Eyes Cody
 Walter Coy
 Ted de Corsia
 John Doucette
 Jack Elam
 Jack Ging (multiple appearances)
 Steve Gravers
 Virginia Gregg
 Robert Griffin
 Brett Halsey (as Lt. Summers)
 Robert Karnes
 DeForest Kelley
 Ray Kellogg
 Gail Kobe
 Bethel Leslie (as Lucinda Cabot)
 Forrest Lewis
 Judy Lewis
 Steve London
 Herbert Lytton
 Walter Maslow
 Robert McQueeney
 Dennis Moore (multiple appearances)
 Burt Mustin (as Mr. Devin)
 Anna Navarro
 Leonard Nimoy
 Vic Perrin
 Glenn Strange
 Joe Turkel
 John Vivyan
 H. M. Wynant

Episodes

Production notes
Prior to Mackenzie's Raiders, Richard Carlson had previously starred in another, more successful Ziv Productions series, "I Led Three Lives" from 1953-1956.

The series was produced by Lou Breslow and Elliott Lewis. Series star Richard Carlson also served as a writer and director.

The series is currently being shown on the over the air channel ThisTV.

DVD release
On October 8, 2013, Timeless Media Group released Mackenzie's Raiders- The TV Series on DVD in Region 1 for the very first time.

References 

 Alex McNeil, Total Television, New York: Penguin Books, 1996, 4th ed., 
 Brooks, Tim and Marsh, Earle, The Complete Directory to Prime Time Network and Cable TV Shows (1999). New York: Ballantine Books

External links 
 
 

1958 American television series debuts
1959 American television series endings
First-run syndicated television programs in the United States
Black-and-white American television shows
Television shows set in Texas
Television series by Ziv Television Programs
1950s Western (genre) television series